Real Kakamora FC is a Solomon Islands football club based in Honiara, which plays in the Telekom S-League.

They were last-minute replacements for Makuru FC to join the newly formed league in 2011.

Current squad 
Squad for the 2020 Solomon Islands S-League

References 

Football clubs in the Solomon Islands
Honiara